Commelina erecta, commonly known as the white mouth dayflower, slender dayflower, or widow's tears, is a perennial herb native throughout the Americas, Africa and western Asia. It is considered to be the most variable species of Commelina in North America.

Distribution and habitat 
Commelina erecta is native to much of the world, including the Americas, Africa and western Asia. In the Americas it is present in the United States, the West Indies, every country of Central America and south through the tropics into Argentina. In the United States it can be found from New York and Nebraska in the north, south to Florida and Texas. In the West Indies it is present throughout Puerto Rico and on several of the Virgin Islands such as Saint Croix, Saint Thomas, Saint John, George Dog Island, Anegada, Great Camanoe, Guana Island, Tortola and Water Island.
The native Slender dayflower is located occasionally in the western half Illinois, Northeast, and Southern Illinois. It is usually in dry sand prairies, woodlands, or anywhere drier than normal. (illinoiswildflowers.info)

In tropical Africa the plant is also widespread. In west Africa it is present in Senegal, Guinea, Guinea-Bissau, Sierra Leone, Liberia, the Ivory Coast, Ghana, Burkina Faso, Benin, Nigeria, and Bioko.

In Nigeria, the plant is known as Ewe Apolukuluku and Itopere. 

In the West Indies it is common in disturbed sites as well as in dry to moist woods from sea level up to 1300 meters.

References

External links

Profile at Flora of Missouri Webpage

Erecta
Flora of Asia
Flora of Africa
Flora of North America
Plants described in 1753
Taxa named by Carl Linnaeus